The Men's 50 kilometre freestyle cross-country skiing competition at the 2006 Winter Olympics in Turin, Italy, was held on 26 February, at Pragelato. This was the final day of the Games, and the top three finishers were presented their medals as part of the Closing Ceremony.

This is the first time in Olympic history that the 50 kilometre race is run as a mass start, where all skiers start at the same time, and the winner of the race is the first to cross the finish line. This is unlike the individual start, where skiers start one by one at 30-second intervals, and the winner is the skier whoever runs the distance the fastest.

The 50 kilometre had previously been skied only once as a mass start event at the World Championships, in 2005, with Frode Estil of Norway winning. However, that was in the classical style. The last 50 kilometre freestyle race at a World Championship was in 2003, and Martin Koukal of the Czech Republic won that event. Mikhail Ivanov of Russia was defending Olympic champion on 50 kilometre, but that event was held in classical technique with individual start. The last Olympic mass start race in 2002, won by Christian Hoffmann of Austria, was a shorter 30 kilometre event.

With a pack of 10–15 skiers coming together towards the finish, Giorgio Di Centa won Italy's second gold medal in cross-country skiing. This was the closest Olympic 50 km ever (0.8 seconds), eclipsing the 4.9 seconds that separated Thomas Wassberg from Gunde Svan (both from Sweden) at the 1984 Winter Olympics in Sarajevo.

A photograph of Di Centa in action during this event would be used as the pictogram for the cross-country skiing events at the following Olympics.

Results

The race was a 'mass start', with all 79 skiers starting at the same time. 13 skiers failed to finish the race, while 3 were originally entered, but did not start.

References

Men's cross-country skiing at the 2006 Winter Olympics
Men's 50 kilometre cross-country skiing at the Winter Olympics